Amram Zur (died 2005) was Israel's first travel ministry commissioner. He was appointed head of the Jerusalem public relations department.

Biography
Amram Zur served in the Jewish Brigade and later became the first Ministry of Tourism travel commissioner for North America.  He was instrumental in increasing the number of visitors to Israel in the 1970s and 1980s and organized the first "peace cruise" travelling between Israel and Egypt.

References

External links
photo with caption
Henry Cohen Interview
Their roles may be reversed Amram Zur 50 as director general of...
A Lasting Reward: Memoirs of an Israeli Diplomat, Yissakhar Ben-Yaacov

British Army soldiers
2005 deaths
Israeli people of American descent

Mandatory Palestine military personnel of World War II
Jewish Brigade personnel